Thurstonfield Lough is an open water lough near Carlisle, Cumbria, and a Site of Special Scientific Interest.

References

Lakes of Cumbria
Sites of Special Scientific Interest in Cumbria
Burgh by Sands